Naval Communications Station may refer to:
Naval Computer and Telecommunications Area Master Station Pacific
Naval Computer and Telecommunications Station Naples, Italy
NAVCOMMSTA Diego Garcia
NAVCOMMSTA Canberra at HMAS Harman
NAVCOMMSTA Puerto Rico at Fort Allen, Puerto Rico
NAVCOMSTAPHIL, United States Naval Communications Station San Miguel, Philippines